Döng-Aryk (also Don-Aryk or Den-Aryk) is a village in the Chüy District of Chüy Region of Kyrgyzstan. The village was established in 1929. Its population was 3,486 in 2021.

References

Populated places in Chüy Region